The 1982 Colorado Buffaloes football team represented the University of Colorado in the Big Eight Conference during the 1982 NCAA Division I-A football season. Led by first-year head coach Bill McCartney, the Buffaloes finished at 2–8–1 (1–5–1 in Big 8, tied for last), their fourth consecutive losing season. Home games were played on campus at  Folsom Field in Boulder, Colorado. 

After three disappointing seasons in Boulder (1979–81), head coach Chuck Fairbanks resigned in early June 1982 to become the head coach, president, and minority owner of the New Jersey Generals of the new United States Football League (USFL). McCartney, the defensive coordinator at Michigan under Bo Schembechler, was announced as Colorado's new head coach on June 9, and led the program for thirteen seasons, through 1994.

It was the second year of blue jerseys for the Buffaloes, which were phased out in 1984.

Schedule

Personnel

Game summaries

Washington State

    
    
    
    

Colorado's first road win since 1979 versus Kansas

References

External links
University of Colorado Athletics – 1982 football roster
Sports-Reference – 1982 Colorado Buffaloes

Colorado
Colorado Buffaloes football seasons
Colorado Buffaloes football